Mariona Rebull may refer to:

 Mariona Rebull (novel), a 1943 Spanish novel
 Mariona Rebull (film), a 1947 Spain film